A squid is a type of marine cephalopod with ten limbs.

Squid or squids may also refer to:

Arts, entertainment, and media
 Squid (band), a post-punk band from Brighton, England
 Squid (DC Comics), a fictional character from DC Comics
 Squid (Marvel Comics), a villain from Marvel Comics
 Squid, a fictional character (villain) from Universal Soldier: The Return
 "Squid" (song), by Paul McCartney from Flaming Pie
 SQUID, a fictional form of virtual reality unit in the film Strange Days
 Squids (video game)
 Squid (game), children's game in Korea
 Squid Game, Korean television show

Other uses
 SQUID (cryptocurrency), cryptocurrency scam based on Squid Game
 Squid (software), a proxy server and web cache
 Squid (weapon), an anti-submarine weapon
 SQUID, a superconducting loop used to make sensitive measurements of magnetic fields
 Squid as food, squid prepared as food

See also 
 
 Giant squid (disambiguation)